Huayra may refer to:
Huayra-tata, an Andean wind god
Pagani Huayra, a 2011 sports car
Huayra Pronello Ford, a 1969 racing car
Telmatobius huayra, a frog endemic to Bolivia
Huayra GNU/Linux, a Linux distribution